Nela Hasanbegović (born 21 January 1984) is a Bosnian sculptor. She graduated from the High School of High Arts in Sarajevo in the Department of Sculpting in 2002. She then graduated from the Academy of Fine Arts in Sarajevo in 2007. She is a member of the Association of Visual Artists of Bosnia and Herzegovina from 2007. Since 2011, she is a member of the Association of Culture and Red Arts. She participated in many solo and group exhibitions.

Works
Between Light and Darkness
Poles

References

External links
Nela Hasanbegović
Artstock, Hasanbegović Nela

1984 births
Living people
Artists from Sarajevo
Bosniaks of Bosnia and Herzegovina
Bosnia and Herzegovina women artists
21st-century Bosnia and Herzegovina artists